Strizivojna is a village and a municipality in Osijek-Baranja County, Croatia, located between Vrpolje and Stari Mikanovci. There are 2,525 inhabitants, absolute majority of whom are Croats.

See also
Strizivojna–Vrpolje railway station

References

Municipalities of Croatia
Populated places in Osijek-Baranja County